Robert Konieczny (born 1969 in Katowice) is a Polish architect. He is the founder and CEO of KWK Promes, an architecture studio based in Katowice. Konieczny is the designer of The Dialogue Centre Upheavals in National Museum of Szczecin which was awarded as The Best Public Space in Europe at European Prize for Urban Public Space organized by Centre de Cultura Contemporània de Barcelona. The project also was named as the World Building of the Year by World Architecture Festival, in 2016. Konieczny also is a member of Académie d'architecture.

Career 
Konieczny graduated from Silesian University of Technology with a with a bachelor's degree in architecture. In 1996, he received the certificate of New Jersey Institute of Technology. In 1999, he founded the KWK Promes architecture studio. Together with the studio, he has received numerous awards and nominations. Konieczny was ten times nominee of the European Award of Mies van der Rohe Foundation.

Awards and recognition
His selected awards include:
 2021: Iconic Award for the Quadrant House
 2020: German Design Award for UNIKATO
 2019: Architizer A+Award for Quadrant House
 2018: German Design Award for By the Way House
 2017: International Architecture Award by The Chicago Athenaeum for Konieczny's Ark
 2017: Best New Private House in worldwide competition Wallpaper Design Awards for Konieczny's Ark 
 2016: European Prize for Urban Public Space for Museum Dialogue Center Przełomy
 2016: World Building of the Year in World Architecture Festival Berlinfor Museum Dialogue Center Przełomy
 2011: Minister of Culture and National Heritage Lifetime Achievement Award.
 2008: Was named as one of 'Europe 40 under 40' by Chicago Athenaeum 
 2008: International Architecture Award by Chicago Athenaeum for Aatrial House and Hidden House 
 2007: 44 Best Young International Architects Robert Konieczny KWK Promes by SCALAE magazine 
 2006: House of the Year Award in World Architecture News for Aatrial House

Selected projects

References

External links 
 Official website

1969 births
Living people
21st-century Polish architects